Thomas Wand-Tetley (26 September 1890 – 4 February 1956) was a British fencer and modern pentathlete. He competed at the 1920 and 1928 Summer Olympics.

References

External links
 

1890 births
1956 deaths
British male fencers
British male modern pentathletes
Olympic fencers of Great Britain
Olympic modern pentathletes of Great Britain
Fencers at the 1920 Summer Olympics
Fencers at the 1928 Summer Olympics
Modern pentathletes at the 1920 Summer Olympics
People from Paignton